HMS Penzance was a member of the standardize 20-gun sixth rates built at the end of the 17th Century. After commissioning she spent her career in Home Waters with a foray to the Moroccan coast. Mainly employed as a trade protection vessel. She was sold in 1713.

Penzance was the first named vessel in the Royal Navy.

Construction
She was ordered in the Second Batch of eight ships to be built under contract by Thomas Ellis of Shoreham. She was launched on 22 April 1695.

Commissioned Service
Commissioning in the Spring of 1695 under Captain Horatio Townsend, RN, who over saw her fitting out in July 1695. On 29 January 1696 Captain John Cooper took command, followed by Captain John Aston on 7 May 1697 for service in Ireland. Captain Aston was dismissed on 6 March 1698. In 1699, Captain Richard Wyatt took command for Sale, Morocco in 1700. During 1701 thru 1704 she was under the command of Commander Thomas Lawrence, RN while serving in the Irish Channel. From 1705 thru 1707 she was under the command of Robert Studely, RN reaining in the Irish channel. Commsnder John Parr, RN commanded her during 1708 thru 1712 for service in the North Sea. She was laid up at Deptford by Admiralty Order (AO) 22 February 1712.

Loss
HMS Penzance was sold to John Bevois for £493 on 24 September 1713.

Notes

Citations

References
 Winfield, British Warships in the Age of Sail (1603 – 1714), by Rif Winfield, published by Seaforth Publishing, England © 2009, EPUB , Chapter 6, The Sixth Rates, Vessels acquired from 18 December 1688, Sixth Rates of 20 guns and up to 26 guns, Maidstone Group, Penzance
 Colledge, Ships of the Royal Navy, by J.J. Colledge, revised and updated by Lt Cdr Ben Warlow and Steve Bush, published by Seaforth Publishing, Barnsley, Great Britain, © 2020, e  (EPUB), Section P (Penzance)

 

1690s ships
Corvettes of the Royal Navy
Naval ships of the United Kingdom